Tohiraukura Makaere Smith-Milner (born 6 October 1995) is a New Zealand professional basketball player for the Wellington Saints of the New Zealand National Basketball League (NZNBL). He has played in the Australian NBL for Melbourne United and the South East Melbourne Phoenix and has represented the New Zealand Tall Blacks.

Early life
Smith-Milner was born and raised in Auckland, where he attended Rosmini College and played junior basketball for Waitakere.

Professional career

NZNBL and Australian state leagues
Smith-Milner started his professional career in 2012 with the championship-winning Auckland Pirates in the New Zealand NBL. He joined the Super City Rangers in 2013 but did not play, going on to make his debut for the Rangers 2014 and averaging 12.7 points per game.

After a season in the United States playing college basketball for Polk State College in 2014–15, Smith-Milner re-joined the Rangers for the 2015 season.

In 2016, Smith-Milner played for the Sandringham Sabres in the SEABL. In 2017, he played for both the Canterbury Rams in the New Zealand NBL and the Frankston Blues in the SEABL. He played for the Nelson Giants in the New Zealand NBL in 2018 and the Kilsyth Cobras in the NBL1 in 2019. He played for the Auckland Huskies in 2020, the Wellington Saints in 2021, and the Sandringham Sabres in 2022.

Smith-Milner joined the Wellington Saints in 2023.

Australian NBL
In 2015, Smith-Milner moved to Australia to play for Melbourne United in the Australian NBL. He spent three seasons as a development player before signing a full-time contract with United in 2018. He spent two seasons with United as a fully contracted player.

On 13 August 2021, Smith-Milner signed a two-year deal with the South East Melbourne Phoenix of the Australian NBL, with the second year being a Club Option.

National team career
Smith-Milner played for the New Zealand Tall Blacks in the 2017 FIBA Asia Cup in Lebanon, where he averaged 10.5 points and 4.2 rebounds. The following year, he was a member of the bronze-medal winning Tall Blacks squad at the 2018 Commonwealth Games. In 2019, he played in the FIBA Basketball World Cup in China, where he averaged 5.2 points and 2.8 rebounds.

In July 2022, Smith-Milner helped New Zealand win bronze at the FIBA Asia Cup. He was subsequently named to the All-Star Five.

References

External links
NBL player profile

1995 births
Living people
Auckland Huskies players
Auckland Pirates players
Basketball players at the 2018 Commonwealth Games
Basketball players from Auckland
Canterbury Rams players
Commonwealth Games bronze medallists for New Zealand
Commonwealth Games medallists in basketball
Melbourne United players
Nelson Giants players
New Zealand expatriate basketball people in Australia
New Zealand men's basketball players
Power forwards (basketball)
South East Melbourne Phoenix players
Super City Rangers players
Wellington Saints players
2019 FIBA Basketball World Cup players
Medallists at the 2018 Commonwealth Games